Robert Anderson (November 15, 1741 – January 9, 1813) was a politician, militia officer, and surveyor from South Carolina. He was a lifelong friend of General Andrew Pickens. Anderson, South Carolina, Anderson County, South Carolina, and the ghost town of Andersonville are named for him.

Early life
He was born on November 15, 1741 in Augusta County, Virginia. His parents were John and Jane Anderson, Presbyterian immigrants who had immigrated to Virginia from the town of Ballymena in County Antrim, Ireland (in what is today Northern Ireland.)

Marriage and children
He married Anne Thompson in 1765. They moved to South Carolina and settled near his friend from Virginia, Andrew Pickens. She died after twenty-five years of marriage. They had five children:
 Robert, Jr., married Maria Thomas.
 Anne married Dr. William Hunter.
 Mary (1766–1810) married Robert Maxwell (1753–1797), a Revolutionary War hero, was appointed as sheriff of the Greenville District. He lived in Greenville County and was killed by an ambush on November 10, 1797 while he was crossing the Saluda River shoals, where Piedmont Mill Dam was later built. His grave is fifteen miles south of Greenville, near Ware Place.
 Jane Anderson (b. 12 June 1775) married William Shaw.
 Elizabeth married Samuel Maverick. One child was Samuel Maverick.

In 1793, Anderson married a second time, to Lydia Maverick, a widow in Pendleton, South Carolina. Her son, Samuel, married Robert's daughter Elizabeth.

After the death of his second wife, he married Mrs. Reese. She was the widow of Dr. Thomas Reese, who was the pastor of Old Stone Church.

Military service
In the American Revolutionary War, he joined the Fifth South Carolina Militia. He became a captain in the regiment commanded by his friend Andrew Pickens when they fought Boyd's Loyalists.

Anderson was one of the Patriots who gave their parole to the British as Ninety Six, South Carolina. Many took up arms after the British had disregarded their promises.

At the Battle of Cowpens, Anderson was a colonel under Brigadier General Andrew Pickens. Anderson also served under Henry "Light Horse Harry" Lee. He fought in the Battle of Eutaw Springs in which the British were victorious. Later, his regiment held the line against the British between Augusta, Georgia and Ninety Six.

On the western frontier, he fought with Andrew Pickens against the Cherokees. A treaty signed in 1777 ceded most of the Cherokee lands in the present Anderson, Oconee, and Pickens counties.

After the war, Anderson was promoted to the rank of general in the state militia.

Political career
He served in the South Carolina House of Representatives from 1791 to 1794 and from 1801 to 1802 from the Pendleton District. He was an elder of the Old Stone Church. In 1800, he was elector for Thomas Jefferson and Aaron Burr.

He owned  in the current Anderson, Oconee, and Pickens Counties including his home, Westville, on the west side of the Seneca River across from Andrew Picken's home, Hopewell.

Death and legacy
He died at his home on January 9, 1813. A flood prevented his burial at Old Stone Church, and he was buried on his estate. During the construction of Lake Hartwell, his body was reinterred at Old Stone Church.

The ghost town of Andersonville, the City of Anderson, and Anderson County were named for him.

References

Sources
 Louise Ayer Vandiver, Traditions and History of Anderson County, Ruralist Press, Atlanta, GA, 1928.
 Frank A. Dickson, Journeys into the Past: The Anderson's Region's Heritage, Sponsored by the Anderson County Bicentennial Committee, 1975.

External links

 Rootsweb Robert Anderson's grave.
 Historical Marker Database Anderson S.C.: The Electric City Historical Marker

1741 births
1813 deaths
American militia generals
Anderson County, South Carolina
Oconee County, South Carolina
People from Augusta County, Virginia
South Carolina militiamen in the American Revolution
American people of Irish descent